Qaidabad or Quaidabad is a neighborhood in the Malir District of Karachi, Pakistan. It was previously a part of Bin Qasim Town, which was disbanded in 2011.

References

External links 
 Karachi Website.

Neighbourhoods of Karachi
Bin Qasim Town